Larry Eugene Rivers (born 1950) is a college president, history professor, and author in the U.S.

Biography and education 
He was born in the Sharon Hill section of Philadelphia, Pennsylvania. He has a Master's degree from Villanova. He received doctorate degrees from Carnegie Mellon University and the University of London. His thesis for the University of London was "Florida's Dissenters, Rebels, and Runaways: Territorial Days to Emancipation."

He married Betty Jean Hubbard, who worked for the City of Tallahassee and has two sons, a history professor and a lawyer. He is Baptist.

Professional career 
He served as Dean of the College of Arts and Sciences at Florida A&M University where he was a colleague of Canter Brown Jr. In 2006 he became the president of his alma mater Fort Valley State University. He held that role until 2013. He was a history professor at Valdosta State University (VSU) in Valdosta, Georgia from 2013 to 2017.

Bibliography
Laborers in the Vineyard of the Lord: The Beginnings of the AME Church in Florida, 1865-1895. Gainesville: University Press of Florida,  2001 (with Canter Brown Jr.)
Slavery in Florida: Territorial Days to Emancipation  University Press of Florida, 2009.
The Varieties of Women's Experiences: Portraits of Southern Women in the Post-Civil War Century. Gainesville: University Press of Florida, 2010. (with Canter Brown, co-ed.)
Mary Edwards Bryan : Her Early Life and Works  University Press of Florida, 2016. (with Canter Brown Jr.)
Rebels and Runaways: Slave Resistance in 19th Century Florida. University of Illinois Press, 2017.
Father James Page: An Enslaved Preacher's Climb to Freedom. Johns Hopkins University Press, 2021.

References

1950 births
Educators from Philadelphia
Villanova University alumni
Carnegie Mellon University alumni
Alumni of the University of London
Baptists from Pennsylvania
Florida A&M University faculty
Fort Valley State University alumni
Fort Valley State University faculty
Valdosta State University faculty
Living people